Peace on Earth, War on Stage is a 7" vinyl E.P. released by Philadelphia hardcore band Blacklisted on Deathwish Inc. It is available on multiple colors and has a total press of 3,000 to date.

Track listing
"Ivory Tower" – 1:20
"Memory Layne" – 1:43
"Canonized" – 1:28
"Setting Sun" – 1:26

References

2007 albums
Deathwish Inc. EPs
Blacklisted (band) albums
Albums with cover art by Jacob Bannon